Mitchell Perry (born 27 April 2000) is an Australian cricketer. He made his List A debut on 19 November 2019, for Victoria in the 2019–20 Marsh One-Day Cup. He made his first-class debut on 30 October 2020, for Victoria in the 2020–21 Sheffield Shield season. He made his Twenty20 debut on 1 January 2021, for the Melbourne Renegades, in the 2020–21 Big Bash League season.

References

External links
 

2000 births
Living people
Australian cricketers
Victoria cricketers
Melbourne Renegades cricketers
Place of birth missing (living people)